Sethupathi is an Indian surname that may refer to
Indian royalty 

Sethupathi, rulers of Ramnad 
Muthuramalinga Sethupathi II (1841–1873)
Raja Rajeswara Sethupathi (1889–1929)
Ramanatha Sethupathi (died 1979)
Vijayaraghunatha Sethupathi (died 1720) 
Raghunatha Kilavan 
Bhaskara Sethupathi 

Others
Rajkumar Sethupathi, Indian actor
Shanmugha Rajeswara Sethupathi (1909–1967), Indian politician
Vijay Sethupathi (born 1978), Indian film actor, producer, lyricist, and dialogue writer 
Latha (actress) or Latha Sethupathi, Indian actress, sister of Rajkumar Sethupathi